The 2nd World Table Tennis Championships were held in Stockholm from January 24 to January 29, 1928.

Medalists

Team

Individual

References

External links
ITTF Museum

 
World Table Tennis Championships
World Table Tennis Championships
World Table Tennis Championships
Table tennis competitions in Sweden
1920s in Stockholm
International sports competitions in Stockholm
World Table Tennis Championships